Giovanni Urbani (26 March 1900 – 17 September 1969) was an Italian cardinal of the Roman Catholic Church. He served as Patriarch of Venice from 1958 until his death, and was elevated to the cardinalate in 1958. He was considered to be overly dependent upon his advisers.

Biography 
Giovanni Urbani was born in Venice to Angelo and Elisabetta (née Borghi) Urbani, and was an artilleryman during World War I. After studying at the Patriarchal Seminary of Venice, he was ordained to the priesthood by Cardinal Pietro La Fontaine on 24 September 1922. Urbani then did pastoral work in Venice until 1925, furthered his studies for a year, and taught at the seminary from 1927 to 1945. He was raised to the rank of privy chamberlain of his holiness on 12 November 1936, and later domestic prelate of his holiness on 5 June 1943.

On 26 October 1946, he was appointed Titular Bishop of Axomis. Urbani received his episcopal consecration on the following 8 December from Cardinal Adeodato Giovanni Piazza, OCD, with Bishops Giovanni Jeremich and Carlo Zinato serving as co-consecrators, in St. Mark's Basilica. Until 1955, he served as secretary and national counselor of Azione Cattolica's Central Commission, which included instructing Italian parishes against communism. Urbani was promoted to Titular Archbishop of Sardes on 27 November 1948, and was later made Bishop of Verona, with the personal title of archbishop, on 14 April 1955.

Pope John XXIII named Urbani to succeed him as Patriarch of Venice on 11 November 1958. He was the first native Venetian to become patriarch since Cardinal Ludovico Flangini Giovanelli (1801–1804), and was created Cardinal-Priest of S. Prisca by Pope John in the consistory of 15 December of that same year. His cardinalatial title was later changed to Cardinal Priest of S. Marco on 19 March 1962. From 1962 to 1965, the Cardinal attended the Second Vatican Council. He was also one of the cardinal electors who participated in the 1963 papal conclave, which selected Pope Paul VI. Because of his moderate views, Urbani was widely seen as papabile at the conclave. In 1964, he prohibited Venetian priests and nuns from attending the Venice Biennale due to the nudism in its exhibitions.

Urbani died from a heart attack in Venice at age 69. He is buried in St. Mark's Basilica.

Papal election 
 During the conclave of 1963, he silenced Giovanni Battista Cardinal Montini after the latter proposed to withdraw his candidacy in order to avoid a prolonged deadlock.
 His position as patriarch of Venice was unique in the fact that both his predecessor and his successor became pope. His successor as patriarch was Albino Luciani, who was elected Pope John Paul I in August 1978.

References

External links 
 Catholic Hierarchy
 Cardinals of the Holy Roman Church

1900 births
1969 deaths
20th-century Italian cardinals
Patriarchs of Venice
Bishops of Verona
Urbani, Giovanni
Cardinals created by Pope John XXIII
20th-century Italian Roman Catholic archbishops